The Consulate-General of Japan in Istanbul is the consulate of Japan in Istanbul, Turkey. Kenichi Kasahara has been the consul general since April 2022. It was opened on 1 January 1965.

References 

Istanbul
Japan
Japan–Turkey relations